Robert Geyer (22 October 1899 – 13 October 1982) was a French middle-distance runner. He competed in the men's 3000 metres steeplechase at the 1920 Summer Olympics.

References

External links

1899 births
1982 deaths
Athletes (track and field) at the 1920 Summer Olympics
French male middle-distance runners
French male steeplechase runners
Olympic athletes of France
20th-century French people